Abaykan is a rural locality (a selo) in Uglovsky Selsoviet of Mazanovsky District, Russia. The population was 4 as of 2018. There are 4 streets.

Geography 
Uglovoye is the nearest rural locality.

History 
The village was established in 1909.

References

External links 
 Administration of Mazanovsky District

Rural localities in Mazanovsky District